Night Court is a 1984–1992 American television sitcom that aired on NBC.

Night Court may also refer to:

 Night Court (2023 TV series), an NBC television series spin-off from the original
 Night Court (film), a 1932 American crime film directed by W. S. Van Dyke

See Also 

 Night Court U.S.A.